Tapan Sinha (2 October 1924 – 15 January 2009) was one of the most prominent Indian film directors of his time forming a legendary quartet with Satyajit Ray, Ritwik Ghatak and Mrinal Sen. He was primarily a Bengali filmmaker who worked both in Hindi cinema and Bengali cinema, directing films like  Kabuliwala (1957), Louha-Kapat, Sagina Mahato (1970), Apanjan (1968), Kshudhita Pashan and children's film Safed Haathi (1978) and Aaj Ka Robinhood. Sinha started his career in 1946, as a sound engineer with New Theatres film production house in Kolkata, then in 1950 left for England where he worked at Pinewood Studios for next two years, before returning home to start his six decade long career in Indian cinema, making films in Bengali, Hindi and Oriya languages, straddling genres from social realism, family drama, labor rights, to children's fantasy films. He was one of the acclaimed filmmakers of Parallel Cinema movement of India.

Personal life and background
Sinha was born in Kolkata, West Bengal. His empathy for films began from his student life. He was admitted in the Durgacharan M. E. School of Bhagalpur in the fifth standard. Later it went on to become a secondary school. His Principal was Surendranath Gangopadhyay who happened to be Sarat Chandra Chattopadhyay’s maternal uncle. He studied physics at the University of Patna and later earned an MSc at the Rajabazar Science College, University of Calcutta.

He married Indian actress Arundhati Devi. Their son is Indian scientist Professor, Anindya Sinha.

On 15 January 2009, he died of pneumonia and septicaemia.

Career

Charles Dickens's novel, A Tale of Two Cities and the cinematic adaptation featuring Ronald Colman inspired Sinha to get involved in film-making. Tapan Sinha went to London in the 1950s to learn film-making. On reaching London, he contacted CryHearsth, Manager of Pinewood Studios. Through his help, he managed to obtain his first assignment. He got to work in director Charles Cryton's unit as a Sound Engineer. Cryton, who made some British comedies like The Lavender Hill Mob etc. was then working for a film called The Hunted. Sinha started as a sound recording engineer and gradually shifted to directing.

Tapan Sinha was greatly influenced by contemporary American and British Cinema, in his youth. Among his favourite directors were John Ford, Carol Reed, and Billy Wilder. He used to think that he had to make films on the lines of his favourites. Rabindranath Tagore's work had been a great source of inspiration to him as well. Different Tagore works had special significance to him in various moments of his life.

Sinha's first film, Ankush, is based on the Narayan Ganguly's story Sainik, which had an elephant as the central character. His next Uphaar featured Uttam Kumar, Manju Dey and others. His Aadhar Periye featured Madhabi Mukherjee, Subhendu Chatterjee, Sumitra Mukherjee, Anil Chatterjee, Nirmal Kumar, Subrota Chaterji, Bikash Roy, Kalyan Chaterji, Chinmoy Roy and others. It is based on a story by Chittaranjan Maity. Sinha's Hatey Bazare is based on an autobiographical story by Banophool. Ashok Kumar and Vyjantimala Bali are the central performers.

Sinha's Ek Je Chilo Desh is a fantasy film, based on a story by Shankar. It concerns a mad scientist who discovers a drug that can reveal an individual's dishonest past. Evil traders and politicians whose lives are endangered by these discoveries conspire to kill the scientist. The cast features Dipankar De, Sumitra Mukherji, Kali Banerji, Anil Chatterjee and others.

Sinha's Louho Kopat is based on the story of the Bengali writer Jorasandho. The film stars Kamal Mitra, Nirmal Kumar as the jailer and Anil Chaterji in a character role. Sabuj Dweeper Raja is a children's film, shot in the Andaman and Nicobar Islands. It is based on a story by Sunil Ganguly. Sinha's Hansuli Banker Upakatha is based on a story by Tara Shankar Banerji and stars Lily Chakraborty.

Kabuliwallah is based on a story by Rabindranath Tagore. Kabullliwallah (Chhabi Biswas) who is dreaded by children turns out to love children. The actors include Chhabi Biswas, Tinku Thakur as Mini, Radhamohan Bhattacharji and Manju De. Tinku Thakur plays Mini, the role of the little girl in the film, and Jiban Bose has a role as well as a jailer, who has good faith in the Kabulliwallah. The Rabindra Sangeet Khoro Bayu Boy Bege Chari Dik Chaye Meghe is used in the film.   He also directed famous movies like, Galpo Holleo Satti (Story but True), Harm and Safed Hathi (in Hindi, White Elephant).

Kabulliwallah (1956) was subsequently remade in Hindi by Bimal Roy and directed by Heman Gupta, featuring Balraj Sahani. Oerdellin was cast as the child lead. The film won the Music Award and the Silver Bear at the 7th Berlin International Film Festival.

Sinha made a few documentaries, including a biographical film on scientist Jagadish Bose. He also used Rabindrasangeet in other films. The Rabindrasangeet Keno Choker Jole Bijeye Dile Na, Sukhno Dulo Joto is used in his film Ekhoni. The film featured Swaroop Dutta, Aparna Sen, Moushumi Chatterjee, Nirmal Kumar, Chinmoy Roy, Padda Devi, Subhendu Chatterjee, N.Vishwanathan and others. The film was based on a novel by Ramapada Chowdhury.

Khoniker Atithe features Nirmal Kumar, Ruma Guha Thakurta, Anil Chaterji, Tulsi Lahiri, Radhamohan Bhattacharjee and others. The film is based on a story of Tagore.

Sinha's Arohi features actors like Kali Banerji, Bikash Roy, Shipra and Bhanu Banerji. This was remade in Hindi by Hrishikesh Mukherji as Arjun Pandit.Arohi was based on a story by Banophool. Safed Hathi, a children's film made in Hindi, features Shatrughan Sinha and Mala Jaggi, and also stars Gayatri. Kalyan Chaterji played a cameo role as a postman. The story was written by Sinha himself.

Sinha's Zindagi Zindagi is a Hindi film with Sunil Dutt and Waheeda Rehman. It fared badly, possibly because the narration was too subtle for Hindi audiences.. Atithi  featured Partha Mukherjee, Smita Sinha and Ajitesh Banerjee. Tonsil is a comedy film, in which Madhabi Mukherjee made her debut.

His Jhinder Bandi is based on a story by Saradindu Bandyopadhyay, the well-known historical story writer in Bengali literature, although it was based on the English novel "The Prisoner of Zenda" by Anthony Hope. The actors include Uttam Kumar, Arundhati Devi, Soumitra Chatterjee, Radhamohan Bhattacharji, Tarun Kumar, Dilip Roy, Sandhya Roy. The first film in which Uttam and Soumitra starred together was Sinha's Jhinder Bandi in which Soumitra was, for the first time, cast as the villain,"Mayurbahan". He had worked in barely a handful of films until then, aside from starting off as the struggling Apu buffeted by waves of tragedy. The film was a success, and yet did not typecast Soumitra with the permanent mark of a villain, as it might have been apt to do with other actors.

Sinha's Sagina Mahato might be categorized as a political film, although it was reactionary in nature and was a direct attack on left-wing politics. It tried to disrepute organized struggle by championing the individual heroism of a worker. Dilip Kumar and Saira Banu play the central characters. Anil Chatterjee also has a supporting role. The Hindi version of the film, named "Sagina", also stars Dilp Kumar as the central character. The film was entered into the 7th Moscow International Film Festival.

Sinha's Kalamati was the first film to deal with life in creches in coalmine areas. Made in 1957, it was much ahead of its time. Anil Chaterji has a role in the film. Raja stars Debraj Ray, Shamit Bhanja, Arati Bhattacharjee, Mahua Roychoudhury, Anil Chaterji, Santu Mukherji and others.

Apanjan is a story of unemployed youths, starring Swarup Dutta and Shamit Bhanja, Chhya Devi, Robi Ghosh, Nirmal Kumar, Sumita Sanyal. This early film focuses on a movement similar to Naxalism in later days. Apon Jan was remade in Hindi by Gulzar as Mere Apne. The film also features Chaya Devi, Rabi Ghosh, Bhanu Banerji, Kalyan Chaterji, Partha Mukherjee, Nirmal Kumar and others.

'Aaj Ka Robinhood, a children's film funded partly by the government and a producer, Jalan, has been screened at twelve International Film Festivals, including Tashkent, Berlin, and Sofia. The film has a running time of 80 minutes. Dubbed in English, it has the English title Return of Robin Hood. In this 1987 film, Sinha returned to the world of children and filmed in Hindi.Nirjan Saikate has performers like Anil Chaterji, Sharmila Tagore, Chhaya Devi, Ruma Guha Thakurta, Bharati, Renuka, Rabi Ghosh, Pahari Sanyal, Nabadip Haldar and Jahar Ganguly. It is the story of five widows, was based on a story by Kalkut (pen-name of Samaresh Basu). In an interview, Tapan Sinha said "He believes that widows have a right to get married. Great social reformers like Vidyasagar and Vivekananda strove ceaselessly to bring about this practice." Harmonium features Durgadas Banerji, Anil Chaterji, Satya Banerjee, Arati Bhattacharji, Swaroop Dutta, Kali Banerji, Samit Bhanja, and Chaya Devi.Bancharamer Bagan includes a performance by Manoj Mitra as an old gardener. Chaplinesque in its approach, the film depicts the tragedy of a small man in this big world. In Khudito Pasan, Dilip Roy gives a performance as a moghul king. This film, based on a story by Gurudev Rabindranath Tagore, also stars Soumitra Chaterji.

Sinha's Jatugriho (Uttam and Arundhuti Devi, Bikash Roy) is a fascinating film drawn from everyday life, specifically what happens when two individuals (Uttam & Arundhuti) meet, quite unexpectedly, on a train, after a long gap in which they have not seen one another. The subject of marital discord has rarely been dealt with more finesse in Indian films.

Sinha's speciality lay in making his images speak with  use of symbolism. For instance, in Jatugriho (based on a short story by Subodh Ghosh), the estranged couple meet by chance in the waiting room of a railway station after years of separation. As the past becomes alive again, they deliberate whether to reunite but decide against it. As they leave by separate trains, heading in opposite directions, the shot cuts to the waiter in the kitchen hanging up their tea cups in two separate hooks, far away from each other but looking very much a pair. A remarkable closing shot that summed up the tragedy of marital discord.Golpo Holo Satyi is a satirical film on how a heaven-sent servant (played by Robi Ghosh) brings order and peace to a quarreling disorganized family. Bhanu Bandyopadhyay, Prasad Mukherjee, Bankim Ghosh, Ajay, Partha Mukherjee & Chinmoy Roy and some lesser-known actors (with the exceptions of Bharati and Chhaya Devi) comprise the cast. This was remade in Hindi by Hrishikesh Mukherji as Bawarchi, with Rajesh Khanna in the lead role.Atanka is based on a true story about a teacher who witnessed a murder, and his subsequent harassment and torture and harassment by the group of hoodlums who committed the crime. Soumitra, Satabdi Roy and Prasenjit Chatterje are the central performers, along with Nirmal Kumar and Manoj Mitra. Nimu Bhowmick and Bhishnu Guha Thakurtha play the villains. Anil Chaterji has a role as one of the teacher's wellwishers.Aadmi Aur Aurat is based on a story by Prafulla Roy. Amol Palekar and Mahua Roy Choudhury act in this piece. Sinha's telefilm Aadmi Aur Aurat was remade in Bengali as Manush (starring Samit Bhanja and Devika Mukherjee) by the director himself. Sinha made another telefilm Didi with Deepti Naval as the central character.

Sinha's Ek Doctor Ki Maut was based on "Abhimanyu," a story by Ramapada Choudhury. Ek Doctor Ki Maut has Shabana Azmi, Pankaj Kapoor, Irfan Khan and Anil Chaterji in the cast. In Ek Doctor Ki Maut there is a touch reminiscent of Ibsen. Dipankar Roy invents a vaccine for leprosy, but the entire community turns against him. In this work, Sinha examines the way society responds to the work. Vijeyandra Ghatge, Vasant Choudhury and Deepa Sahi have cameos in the film. "Talent is subject to ridicule. The more you excel the more number of enemies you seem to have: Why this animosity towards Excellence?" Ek Doctor Ki Maut won the Rajat Kamal for the second best feature film of the year, besides earning Sinha the Best Director Award.

Sinha's Wheelchair has a cast of Soumitra Chatterjee, Laboni Sarkar, Arjun Chakraborty and Ruma Guha Thakurta. Sarkar gives a performance as a handicapped character who uses a wheelchair. The film was based on a story by the director himself, although it was inspired by the life of a crusading doctor. Wheelchair is about a young woman who is molested late one evening in jer office. While fighting off the three men, she sustains injuries and is bedridden for a while. She is fortunate enough, however, to receive proper medical care and also emotional support, and in the end, she can look forward to a better life.Adalat o Ekti Meye (Bengali/1981) features Tanuja, Biplab Chatterjee and Manoj Mitra. The film departs from Sinha's usual style. Urmila (Tanuja), a young teacher on a holiday, is raped by a gang of wealthy young men. The culprits are arrested, but Urmila is shunned by her friends, fiancé and even parents. She is an outcast like Dr. Roy in Ek Doctor Ki Maut. The difference is that while Urmila is ostracised through no fault of her own, Roy faces social wrath because of his talent.

Sinha's Antardhaan stars Soumitro Chaterji, Madhabi, Manoj Mitra, Sabyasachi Chakraborty, Satabdi Roy, Riku Dutta, Bhisma Guha Thakurtha, Ramen Roy Choudhury, Nirmal Chakravorty, and Arjun Chakravorty. It deals with the disappearance of a girl and her lover and is based on a story by Dibyendu Palit. Sinha feels that some fictionalisation of a real-life incident, or even a newspaper report from which the source of the original story is supposed to be derived, is necessary for cinematic dramatisation. Riku Dutta, a newcomer to films who is regularly seen in television serials, was excited to act in this film of Sinha who, she says, is the mentor of many new artistes.

In the series of films that Sinha made in the last eight years of his life, a trusting and idealistic man, assailed by unfortunate circumstances or hostile and scheming persons, stands out as an example of indomitable individualism. "I have always believed in individual courage and effort. I think, collective system or life hardly allows an individual to discover the infinite strength within him. I like the individual who has the courage to face any untoward situation, which is why I have shown an individual as a relentless fighter against all hazards in Aadmi Aur Aurat, Atanka and Ek Doctor Ki Maut. My protagonists in these films have practically done miracles by their own strength and self-confidence. In Antardhaan also, the Professor takes up the job of finding out his missing daughter. He depends only on himself and on none else, says the Director.Boiduryo Rahasya was a detective film.Manoj Mitra, Bhishma Guha Thakurtha, Tapas Paul, Alpana Goswami, Moon Moon Sen, Nirmal Kumar and Premansu Bose with Basanta Choudhury form the cast. Sinha presented five hit films in succession: Kshudita Pasan, Kabuliwallah, Hatey Bazare, Apanjan and Ekhani. This created a record that is thus far unsurpassed

Sinha's 5 part feature film Daughter of this Century marked a new beginning in Indian Cinema. Starring Shabana Azmi, Jaya Bachchan, Nandita Das, Deepa Sahi, and Sulabha Deshpande in central roles, the film was produced by Shunya Communications under the tutelage of Sesh Nath Banerjee and Mohan Das. The film was based on stories by noted writers over a span of century that highlighted the negligence and indifference towards the women folk of our country. Starting with a Rabindranath Tagore's "Jibito o Mrito", it also incorporated stories of other notable Bengali writers like Sarat Chandra Chaterji, Gour Kishore Ghosh, Prafulla Sen and Dibyendu Palit. Five actress played the central roles and were supported by the who's who of Tollygunge that included Jeet, Debashree Roy, Arjun Chakraborty, Rita Koyral, Gyanesh Mukherjee, Amit Banerjee, Kaushik Sen, Joy Badlani, Papia Sen and many others. The director wanted to convey the message that in spite of tremendous scientific advancements, attitudes towards women have not changed much in the span of a century.

Raja Sen's documentary on Tapan Sinha is entitled Filmmaker for Freedom. Sinha made a detective TV serial Hutumer Naksa, casting Soumitra Chaterji, Manoj Mitra, Dhiman Chakravorty, Robi Ghosh and others.

Sinha's wife, filmmaker Arundhuti Devi, died in 1990.Aajab Gayer Aajab Katha is based on a novelette by eminent Bengali writer Shirsendu Mukhopadhay. This film, in Sinha's own words "is a semi-fantasy designed for all, including children." Aajab Gayer Aajab Katha "is a strange story of a strange village." The message is, it is necessary to have a community drive to get anything done in today's society. "We must not look at the Government for everything," says the Director. "In the west and also in the far east, there is a system of community initiatives. I believe, we should have this same kind of approach too." He adds, "According to this story, a person has to prepare himself to confront any adversary." The cast of Aajab Gayer includes Debasree Roy starring as a light-hearted village girl. "Debasree has not done such a role before and I found her absolutely suitable for it," said the director. She is the only female character in the film, which also brought a new face, Debesh Roy Choudhury, to the big screen. His role requires him to do a lot of "physical labor, including sprinting." The rest of the cast includes Soumitra Chaterji, Manoj Mitra, Nirmal Kumar, and Bibhas Chakravorty, Koushik Sen. Ten days of shooting were done at Falta, on the banks of the Ganga, starting on 7 December 1997. The following month, some shots were taken in a village house.

Sinha's final venture, the children's filme Anokha Moti, was incomplete. The film stars Arjun Chakravorty, and is being made in Hindi.

Death

On 15 January 2009, he died of pneumonia and septicaemia.

Legacy
In January 2010, the then railway minister Mamata Banerjee, laid the foundation stone of the Tapan Sinha Memorial Metro Hospital, at Tollygunge, Kolkata.
Tapan's works left an impact and influence on Bollywood filmmakers like Hemen Gupta, Hrishikesh Mukherjee, Gulzar, Ashutosh Gowariker
and Bengali filmmakers like Raja Sen,Kamaleshwar Mukherjee. His work Highly influence and impact and  popular culture by Bengali Filmmaker Tarun Majumdar.While in London, he was exposed to the works of Italian directors Federico Fellini, Vittorio De Sica and Roberto Rossellini. Tapan Sinha has also served as a member of the jury in the popular film festivals at Tashkent and San Francisco among others. Tapan Sinha has been selected for the Dada Saheb Phalke Award for the year 2008 for his outstanding contribution to Indian cinema.

Television career
Aadmi Aur Aurat is based on a story by Prafulla Roy. Amol Palekar and Mahua Roy Choudhury act in this piece. Sinha's telefilm Aadmi Aur Aurat was remade in Bengali as Manush (starring Samit Bhanja and Devika Mukherjee) by the director himself. Sinha made another telefilm Didi with Deepti Naval as the central character.

Awards
Civilian award
 Padma Shri (1992)

National Film Awards
 1956: National Film Award for Best Feature Film – Kabuliwala 1956: National Film Award for Best Feature Film in Bengali – Kabuliwala 1957: National Film Award for Best Feature Film in Bengali – Louha-Kapat 1960: National Film Award for Second Best Feature Film – Kshudhita Pashan 1965: National Film Award for Second Best Feature Film – Atithi 1967: National Film Award for Best Feature Film- Hatey Bazarey 1968: National Film Award for Best Feature Film in Bengali- Apanjan 1971: Best Screenplay – Ekhonee 1977: National Film Award for Best Children's Film - Safed Haathi 
 1984: Nargis Dutt Award for Best Feature Film on National Integration - Aadmi Aur Aurat 1990: Best Direction – Ek Doctor Ki Maut 1990: National Film Award for Second Best Feature Film- Ek Doctor Ki Maut 1994: National Film Award for Best Film on Other Social Issues- Wheelchair''
 2006: Dadasaheb Phalke Award

International Awards
Best Film-Cork festival, Ireland for Khudhita Pashan
Silver Bear Extraordinary Prize of the Jury at 7th Berlin International Film Festival for Kabuliwala
Jury Award-Sanfransisco Film Festival for Hansuli Banker Upokotha
Silver Peacock-2nd best film, International Film Festival of India & Audience Award, Sydney Film Festival for Nirjan Saikate
International Certificate of Merit, Venice Film Festival for Atithi 
Diploma of Merit, London Film Festival for Aarohi
Silver Leopard, Locarno Film Festival for Aarohi
Award for Best Film-Royal Cup, Cambodia Asian Film festival for Hatey Bazarey
Award for Best film in 13th Asia Pacific Film Festival for Hatey Bazarey
Silver trophy (Cup of honour) in Phnom Penh Film Festival for Hatey Bazarey
Afro-Asian Award, Moscow Film Festival for Sagina Mahato
Golden Crown for Best Music, Seoul Asian Film Festival for Harmonium
Special Award 'Child of our Time', Vii Film Festival, Milano for Safed Haathi
UNICEF Award(Honorable Mention), Berlin Film festival for Aaj Ka Robin Hood

Filmography
 Ankush (1954)
 Upahaar (1955)
 Tonsil (1956)
 Kabuliwala (1957)
 Lauha Kapat (1958)
 Kala Mati (1958)
 Khaniker Atithi (1959)
 Khudhito Pashan (1960)
 Jhinder Bandi (1961)
 Hansuli Banker Upakatha (1962)
 Nirjan Saikate (1963)
 Jatugriha (1964)
 Arohi (1964)
 Atithi (1965)
 Galpo Holeo Satti (1966)
 Hatey Bazarey (1967)
 Apanjan (1968)
 Sagina Mahato (1970)
 Ekhoni (1971)
 Zindagi Zindagi (1972)
 Aandhar Periye (1973)
 Sagina (1974, Hindi)
 Raja (1975)
 Harmonium (1976)
 Ek Je Chhilo Desh (1977)
 Safed Haathi (1978)
 Sabuj Dwiper Raja (1979)
 Banchharamer Bagan (1980)
 Adalat o Ekti Meye (1982)
 Aadmi Aur Aurat (1982)
 Manush (1983)
 Didi (1984)
 Baidurya Rahasya (1985)
 Atanka (1986)
 Aaj Ka Robin Hood (1988)
 Ek Doctor Ki Maut (1991)
 Antardhan (1992)
 Wheel Chair (1994)
 Daughters of This Century (1999)
 Hutumer Naksha
 Ajab Gayer Ajab Katha (1998)
 Anokha Moti (2000)

References

External links
 
 Tapan Sinha: Saluting The Indomitable Human Spirit
 The Films of Tapan Sinha 
 Tapan Sinha at calcuttaweb.com

Bengali film directors
Bengali Hindus
Dadasaheb Phalke Award recipients
Deaths from bronchopneumonia
Hindi-language film directors
20th-century Indian film directors
Deaths from pneumonia in India
Film directors from Kolkata
1924 births
2009 deaths
Patna University alumni
University of Calcutta alumni
Best Director National Film Award winners
Indian male screenwriters
Recipients of the Padma Shri in arts
Best Original Screenplay National Film Award winners
Directors who won the Best Feature Film National Film Award
Directors who won the Best Children's Film National Film Award
Directors who won the Best Film on National Integration National Film Award
Directors who won the Best Film on Other Social Issues National Film Award
People from New Alipore
20th-century Indian screenwriters
Deaths from sepsis
20th-century Indian male writers